Ornipholidotos kivu is a butterfly in the family Lycaenidae. It is found in Kivu in the Democratic Republic of the Congo. The habitat consists of forests.

References

Butterflies described in 2000
Ornipholidotos
Endemic fauna of the Democratic Republic of the Congo
Butterflies of Africa